The Lavonia Carnegie Library is a historic library building at 28 Hartwell Road in Lavonia, Georgia.  It was built in 1911 with funding support from Andrew Carnegie, and is the most architecturally sophisticated building in the small community.  It is a single-story buff brick building with Renaissance Revival styling.  Founded in 1904 to be the Lavonia public library; it was merged as a branch of the Athens Regional Library System.

The building was listed on the National Register of Historic Places in 1983.

See also
National Register of Historic Places listings in Franklin County, Georgia
List of Carnegie libraries in Georgia

References

Libraries on the National Register of Historic Places in Georgia (U.S. state)
Library buildings completed in 1911
Carnegie libraries in Georgia (U.S. state)
National Register of Historic Places in Franklin County, Georgia
Government buildings completed in 1911